William Gopallawa  (17 September 1896 – 31 January 1981) was the last Governor-General of Ceylon from 1962 to 1972 and became the first and only non-executive and ceremonial President of Sri Lanka when Ceylon declared itself a republic in 1972 and changed its name to Sri Lanka. From 1948 to 1972, the Dominion of Ceylon was a Commonwealth realm with Queen Elizabeth II as the head of state and Queen of Ceylon. He served as Governor-General during the tenure of different governments headed by Sirimavo Bandaranaike of the SLFP and Dudley Senanayake of the UNP.

Early life and education
William Gopallawa was born on 17 September 1896 at the Dullewe Maha Walauwa, Dullewe, Aluvihare, a suburb of Matale. He was related to Dullewe Dissava, a signatory on behalf of the Sinhalese to the Kandiyan Convention of 1815, by his mother Tikiri Kumarihamy Dullewe. His father, Tikiri Bandara Gopallawa died when he was three years old.

He received his primary education at the Dullewe village school and at St. John's College, Kandy. After having sat the Cambridge Senior Certificate Examination in 1917, he returned to Matale and joined as one of the tutorial staff of the Buddhist English School and was also instrumental in setting up a library and a Scout troop for the benefit of the students there.

Legal career 
In 1920, Gopallawa joined the Ceylon Law College, Colombo and was enrolled as a Proctor and Notary Public in 1924. He started his legal practice as a junior to Bernard Aluwihare in the unofficial bar of Kandy and went on to develop a practice in Matale, Dumbara and Kandy from 1924 until he took up duties as Municipal Commissioner, Kandy in 1939. He continued his practice on and off until he became the Municipal Commissioner of Colombo Municipal Council.

Political career 
In 1926, Gopallawa contested and won in the Matale Urban Council Elections and served continuously in the council for a period of 13 years from 1926 to 1939. He served as the chairman of the Matale Urban Council for 5 years, at his office he was the youngest Urban Council Chairman in Ceylon at that time. In 1936, Gopallawa unsuccessfully contested for the Matale seat at the State Council Elections in 1936. In 1939, the Kandy Municipal Council was established and Gopallawa was appointed as the first Municipal Commissioner of Kandy. He served in that capacity throughout World War II and acquitted himself for efficiency during the great floods in 1950. In 1951, he was appointed as Municipal Commissioner of Colombo Municipal Council and served until 1957, when he stepped down from the post. He was appointed a Member of the Order of the British Empire in the 1953 Coronation Honours.

Diplomatic role 
On 18 June 1958 when S. W. R. D. Bandaranaike's government started diplomatic relations with the People's Republic of China, Gopallawa was posted as the second Ambassador to China in 1960. On 7 September 1961, while he was serving in China, he was recalled and posted as the Ambassador to the United States; he served there until 1962.

Governor-General of Ceylon and President of Sri Lanka 

In 1962, he was called back to Ceylon, after his son in law's sister, the then prime minister Sirimavo Bandaranaike nominated Gopallawa as Governor-General of Ceylon following Sir Oliver Goonetilleke's implication in the attempted military coup earlier that year. He was the second native Ceylonese Governor-General and the first Buddhist to hold the post as the viceregal representative of Queen Elizabeth II who was the head of state. Gopallawa served in this capacity until 1972, when he became the first President of Sri Lanka.

His constitutional decision to invite the UNP which won the majority of parliamentary seats in the 1965 general election, (but not enough for an absolute majority) is heralded as a landmark moment where he respected the nation's constitution and its people's wishes more than the wishes of the defeated SLFP government (that appointed him as Governor-General of Ceylon) which wanted him to delay inviting the winning party to form the government. It averted a major crisis of leadership.

When Ceylon became the Republic of Sri Lanka on 22 May 1972, Gopallawa became the first President. He stepped down from office in February 1978 when then Prime Minister Junius Richard Jayewardene became President following constitutional changes that effected the creation of an executive Presidency.

Faith 
While he was a devout Buddhist, he respected all faiths and never failed to attend the annual Vel Hindu ceremony and never failed to host Christmas carols and also attended various Muslim ceremonies in his role as titular head of state; he was acutely cognizant of his role as a unifier of all Sri Lankans during his tenure. He was the first to establish a spartan Buddhist shrine room at the President's House.

Family 
On 8 March 1928, Gopallawa married Seelawathie Rambukwella; they had 5 children. He was survived by 4 children out of 5. One died early on while he was still working in Matale. His eldest daughter Chandrika Iranganie married Dr. Mackie Ratwatte, the private secretary and a brother of Sirimavo Bandaranaike. His oldest son Asoka is a entrepreneur businessman, His second daughter Chinthamani, was a teacher and landed proprietor, and his youngest son Monty Gopallawa who died in 2005, was a member of parliament and an affable cabinet minister in the government of President Chandrika Kumaratunga (daughter of Sirimavo Bandaranaike). He had 13 grandchildren; Chandhaka, Dhammika, Mano, Anushka, Devika, Avanthi, Sureka, Lehka, Shiranthani, Ashani, Mahen, Shanika and Dilani.

Honours 
 Member of The Most Excellent Order of the British Empire (MBE) in 1953 
 LLD (Honoris Causa) from the University of Ceylon in 1962
 LLD from the Vidyalankara in 1962
 D.Litt. from the Vidyodaya in 1962.
 King Birendra of Nepal Coronation Medal on 24 February 1975

See also 
 List of political families in Sri Lanka
 Sri Lankan Non Career Diplomats

References 

 A dignified symbol of the nation Daily News on the 104th birth anniversary
 William Gopallawa, the first President The 31st anniversary of Presidency
 New York times news on Death
  First President of the Republic of Sri Lanka

External links 

 The Gopallawa Ancestry
 William Gopallawa's presidential Flag on crwflags.com

1896 births
1981 deaths
Presidents of Sri Lanka
Governors-general of Ceylon
Ceylonese Members of the Order of the British Empire
Ambassadors of Sri Lanka to China
Ambassadors of Sri Lanka to the United States
Sinhalese politicians
William
Secretaries-General of the Non-Aligned Movement
Alumni of Dharmaraja College
Alumni of St. Anthony's College, Kandy
Sri Lankan Buddhists
People from Matale
People from British Ceylon
Scouting and Guiding in Sri Lanka
Ceylonese proctors
Sri Lankan notaries